Blakeley Island may refer to:
Blakeley Island (Alabama)
Blakely Island, Washington